Voskochori is a village and a community of the Kozani municipality. Before the 2011 local government reform it was part of the municipality of Ellispontos, of which it was a municipal district. The 2011 census recorded 120 inhabitants in the community. The community of Voskochori covers an area of 25.099 km2.

See also
List of settlements in the Kozani regional unit

References

Populated places in Kozani (regional unit)